The 1833 Alabama gubernatorial election was an uncontested election held on August 5, 1833, to elect the governor of Alabama. Democratic candidate John Gayle stood unopposed and so was elected with 100% of the vote.

General election

Candidates
John Gayle, incumbent Governor since 1831.

Results

References

Alabama gubernatorial elections
Alabama
1833 Alabama elections
August 1833 events